Walter Percival (May 2, 1887–January 28,1934) was an American actor, producer, and writer on the stage and screen. He performed in numerous theater productions before making his film debut in 1918.

In 1909, Percival was part of a company headed by Grace Van Studdiford. His Broadway debut was in A Venetian Romance (1904), and his last Broadway performance was in Find Daddy (1926).

Filmography
 Our Mrs. McChesney (1918)
 The Moral Sinner (1924)
 The Flying Horseman (1926)
 The Big City (1928)
 Lights of New York (1928)
 Lightnin' (1930)
 The Avenger (1931)
 The Homicide Squad (1931)
 Cabin in the Cotton (1932)
 Tillie and Gus (1933)

References

External links

1887 births
1934 deaths
20th-century American male actors
American male film actors
American male stage actors
Broadway theatre people